Post & Telecommunication Hub (also known as Guangdong Telecom Plaza) is a 68-storey,  skyscraper in Guangzhou, China. The building was completed in 2003.

See also
 List of skyscrapers

References

External links
 Latitude and longitude of Post & Telecommunication Hub

Skyscraper office buildings in Guangzhou
Buildings and structures completed in 2003
Yuexiu District